The Impassive Footman is a 1932 British, low-budget "quota quickie" drama film directed by Basil Dean and starring Owen Nares, Betty Stockfeld, Allan Jeayes and George Curzon. The film's sets were designed by Edward Carrick. It was also released under the alternative title Woman in Bondage.

Plot
On a cruise ship, Mrs Marwood becomes involved in a platonic relationship with the ship's doctor who treats her hypochondriac husband. This leads to a series of violent quarrels, all witnessed by the family's footman who is the only one who knows entirely what is going on.

Cast
 Owen Nares as Bryan Daventry
 Betty Stockfeld as Grace Marwood
 Allan Jeayes as John Marwood
 George Curzon as Simpson
 Aubrey Mather as Doctor Bartlett
 Frances Rose Campbell as Mrs Angers
 Florence Harwood as Mrs Hoggs

References

Bibliography
 Low, Rachael. Filmmaking in 1930s Britain. George Allen & Unwin, 1985.
 Perry, George. Forever Ealing. Pavilion Books, 1994.

External links

1932 films
1932 drama films
British black-and-white films
British drama films
British films based on plays
Films directed by Basil Dean
Films set in London
Associated Talking Pictures
Quota quickies
Films with screenplays by John Paddy Carstairs
1930s English-language films
1930s British films